Francesco Acciaioli may refer to:

 Francesco I Acciaioli, Duke of Athens
 Francesco II Acciaioli (died 1460), Duke of Athens